Punta de las Figuras Light  is an historic lighthouse located in Arroyo, Puerto Rico. It was first lit by the Spanish government in 1893. The light was relocated in 1938, and the structure was deactivated and abandoned.   During World War II, the lighthouse was used as a lookout. After the U.S. Army abandoned the structure in 1963, the lighthouse  was repeatedly vandalized. In  1969 the lens and lantern were destroyed. The lighthouse was again damaged by Hurricane Maria on September 20, 2017. The light housing is broken, all of the windows are boarded up, and several of the surrounding light pole fixtures are downed.  The interior is currently inaccessible.

The lighthouse was listed on the U.S. National Register of Historic Places in 1981. In 2003, the Puerto Rican government rehabilitated it at a cost of two million dollars. The lighthouse is located at the entrance of the  beach resort managed by the Puerto Rico National Parks Company.

See also
List of lighthouses in Puerto Rico
National Register of Historic Places in Arroyo, Puerto Rico

References

External links
Summary sheet from the Puerto Rico State Historic Preservation Office 

, National Register of Historic Places cover documentation

 Photos and drawings of Faro de Punta de Las Figuras with the Library of Congress

Historic American Engineering Record in Puerto Rico
Lighthouses on the National Register of Historic Places in Puerto Rico
Lighthouses completed in 1893
Neoclassical architecture in Puerto Rico
Spanish Colonial architecture in Puerto Rico
1893 establishments in Puerto Rico